Sorond (also known as Sarūn) is a village in Baghestan Rural District, in the Eslamiyeh District of Ferdows County, South Khorasan Province, Iran. At the 2006 census, its population was 506, in 174 families.

References 

Populated places in Ferdows County